John Henry Crichton, 4th Earl Erne,  (16 October 1839 – 2 December 1914), styled Viscount Crichton from 1842 to 1885, was an Anglo-Irish peer and Conservative politician.

Early life
Erne was the eldest son of Selina Griselda, Countess Erne (née Beresford) and John Crichton, 3rd Earl Erne of Crom Castle. His younger siblings included Col. Hon. Charles Frederick Crichton (who married Lady Madeline Taylour, eldest daughter of Thomas Taylour, 3rd Marquess of Headfort), Lt.-Col. Hon. Sir Henry George Louis Crichton, the aide de camp to King Edward VII, and Lady Louisa Anne Catherine Crichton.

His paternal grandparents were Lt.-Col. Hon. John Crichton, Governor of Hurst Castle and the former Jane Weldon (a daughter of Walter Weldon). His father had succeeded to the earldom upon the death of his grand-uncle, Abraham Creighton, 2nd Earl Erne (MP for Lifford from 1790 to 1797 who was declared insane in 1798 and then incarcerated at Brooke House, London, for the next forty years). His maternal grandparents were the former Amelia Montgomery (a daughter of Sir William Montgomery, 1st Baronet of Magbie Hill) and the Rev. Charles Cobbe Beresford, Rector of Termonmaguirk. His aunt, Anna Beresford, was the wife of Lord John Thynne (third son of Thomas Thynne, 2nd Marquess of Bath).

Career
He was appointed High Sheriff of Donegal for 1867. He was then elected to the House of Commons for Enniskillen in 1868, a seat he held until 1880, and then represented Fermanagh from 1880 to 1885. Between 1876 and 1880 he served as a Lord of the Treasury in the Conservative administration of Benjamin Disraeli. In October 1885 he succeeded his father as fourth Earl Erne and entered the House of Lords, and served as Lord Lieutenant of County Fermanagh from 1885 to 1914.

He was made a Knight of the Order of St Patrick in 1889; and was appointed to the Privy Council of Ireland in the 1902 Coronation Honours list published on 26 June 1902, being sworn in by the Lord Lieutenant of Ireland, Earl Cadogan, at Dublin Castle on 11 August 1902.

Personal life
On 28 December 1870, Lord Erne was married to Lady Florence Mary Cole, daughter of William Willoughby Cole, 3rd Earl of Enniskillen and the former Jane Casamaijor (daughter of James Casamaijor). Together, they were the parents of:

 Hon. Henry William Crichton (1872–1914), styled Viscount Crichton, who married Lady Mary Cavendish Grosvenor, a daughter of Hon. Katherine Cavendish (third daughter of the 2nd Baron Chesham) and Hugh Grosvenor, 1st Duke of Westminster. After his death in 1914, Lady Mary married Col. the Hon. Algernon Francis Stanley (a son of Frederick Stanley, 16th Earl of Derby).
 Hon. Sir George Arthur Charles Crichton (1874–1952), who married Lady Mary Augusta Dawson, second daughter of Vesey Dawson, 2nd Earl of Dartrey and Julia Wombwell (eldest daughter of Sir George Wombwell, 4th Baronet) in 1913. He served as Comptroller of the Lord Chamberlain's Office, Extra Equerry to King George V, Edward VIII, and George VI, and Registrar and Secretary Central Chancery of the Orders of Knighthood.
 Hon. Arthur Owen Crichton (1876–1970), who married Katherine Helen Elizabeth Trefusis, third daughter of Col. Hon. Walter Rodolph Trefusis (a son of Charles Trefusis, 19th Baron Clinton) and Lady Mary Montagu-Douglas-Scott (a daughter of Walter Montagu-Douglas-Scott, 5th Duke of Buccleuch), in 1906.
 Hon. James Archibald Crichton (1877–1956)
 Lady Mabel Crichton (1882–1944), who married Lord Hugh Grosvenor, the sixth son of the 1st Duke of Westminster. After Lord Hugh was killed during the First World War, she remarried to Maj. Robert Hamilton Stubber, a son of Robert Hamilton-Stubber, in 1920.

On 31 October 1914, his eldest son Henry, a Major (Brevet Lt.-Col.) in the Royal Horse Guards, was killed in action, aged 42, during the Great War, and was is buried at Zantvoorde British Cemetery in Flanders. Only a month later, Lord Erne died on 2 December 1914, aged 75, and was succeeded in his titles by his seven-year-old grandson John, his eldest son having predeceased him.

Descendants
His grandson, and heir, John Crichton, 5th Earl Erne was also killed in action, with the 5th Earl's death occurring on 23 May 1940 during the Second World War. He was also a grandfather of Lady Mary Kathleen Crichton, Mistress of the Robes to Queen Elizabeth The Queen Mother, who married James Hamilton, 4th Duke of Abercorn in 1928.

Through his daughter, Lady Mabel, he was a grandfather of Gerald and Robert, the 4th and 5th Dukes of Westminster.

References

External links

www.thepeerage.com

1839 births
1914 deaths
High Sheriffs of County Fermanagh
Knights of St Patrick
Lord-Lieutenants of Fermanagh
Members of the Privy Council of Ireland
Crichton, John
Crichton, John
Crichton, John
Crichton, John
UK MPs who inherited peerages
High Sheriffs of Donegal
Grand Masters of the Orange Order
Earls Erne